The 1973–74 season was Liverpool Football Club's 82nd season in existence and their 12th consecutive season in the First Division. Liverpool won the FA Cup in Bill Shankly's 14th and final season in charge. Announcing his retirement two months after winning 3-0 against Newcastle in the final, Shankly was hailed by the fans as a hero, when heading into retirement. Kevin Keegan scored twice in the final, further confirming his status among the Liverpool faithful. However, the club's second-place finishing in the league saw them lose their defence of the league title to Don Revie's Leeds United.

Squad

Goalkeepers
  Ray Clemence
  Frankie Lane

Defenders
  Roy Evans
  Emlyn Hughes
  Chris Lawler
  Alec Lindsay
  Larry Lloyd
  John McLaughlin
  Dave Rylands
  Tommy Smith
  Phil Thompson

Midfielders
  Ian Callaghan
  Peter Cormack
  Brian Hall
  Steve Heighway
  Hughie McAuley
  Peter Spiring
  Max Thompson
  Peter Thompson

Attackers
  Phil Boersma
  Derek Brownbill
  David Fairclough
  Kevin Keegan
  Kevin Kewley
  John Toshack
  Alan Waddle
  Jack Whitham

League table

Results

First Division

Football League Cup

European Cup

FA Cup

Final

References
 LFC History.net – 1973–74 season
 Liverweb - 1973-74 Season

Liverpool F.C. seasons
Liverpool